Bradford Evan Rusin (born September 5, 1986) is an American retired professional soccer player. He appeared for Bradenton Academics, Ventura County Fusion, and San Fernando Valley Quakes at the semi-professional level, and for Carolina RailHawks, HB Køge, Vancouver Whitecaps FC, Orlando City, Tampa Bay Rowdies, San Antonio Scorpions, Miami FC, and Indy Eleven at the professional level.

College and amateur
Rusin grew up in Indiana and moved to Holmes Beach, Florida in 2002. There, he attended St. Stephen's Preparatory School, where he was a 2005 EA Sports All-American. He attended the IMG Soccer Academy in Bradenton, Florida from 2002 to 2005, winning the 2005 U-19 Dallas Cup, before playing college soccer at UCLA. He was named to the College Soccer News All-Freshman first team and to Top Drawer Soccer's All-Rookie Team in 2005, earned honorable mention All-Pac-10 honors in 2006 and 2007, and was named to the NSCAA All-Far West Region second team, the All-Pac-10 first team and the Top Drawer Soccer Team of the Season second team in 2008.

During his college years he also played with Bradenton Academics, Ventura County Fusion and San Fernando Valley Quakes in the Premier Development League, helping the Quakes to the PDL Southwest Division title in 2008.

Club career
Having already trialed with Premier League side Bolton Wanderers in the summer of 2004, Rusin travelled to Norway in the summer of 2008 to trial with both IK Start and Bodø/Glimt. Having not been offered a contract by either team, Rusin joined Carolina RailHawks of the USL First Division in April 2009. He made his professional debut on May 2, 2009, in a game against Portland Timbers. In August 2010, HB Køge of the Danish 1st Division expressed an interest in Rusin, but was unable to come to an agreement with the RailHawks. Rusin was named team captain in 2011, but on July 6 he signed a three-year deal with HB Køge, which had won promotion to the Danish Superliga for the upcoming season.

On January 11, 2013, Rusin was sold to Major League Soccer club Vancouver Whitecaps FC for an undisclosed fee.

On February 12, 2014, Rusin signed with USL Pro club Orlando City on a one-year deal. He was released upon the conclusion of the 2014 season, a casualty of the club's transition to Major League Soccer.

On December 24, 2014, Rusin signed with North American Soccer League club Tampa Bay Rowdies. Rusin was traded to the San Antonio Scorpions in exchange for midfielder Richard Menjívar on April 29, 2015.

On December 15, 2015, NASL expansion side Miami FC officially announced their signing of Rusin, alongside midfielder Blake Smith.

On January 25, 2018, Rusin signed for USL side Indy Eleven for the 2018 season.

Career statistics

References

External links

 
 

Living people
1986 births
American soccer players
Soccer players from Indiana
People from Crown Point, Indiana
Association football defenders
UCLA Bruins men's soccer players
IMG Academy Bradenton players
Ventura County Fusion players
San Fernando Valley Quakes players
North Carolina FC players
HB Køge players
Vancouver Whitecaps FC players
Orlando City SC (2010–2014) players
Tampa Bay Rowdies players
San Antonio Scorpions players
Miami FC players
Indy Eleven players
USL League Two players
USL First Division players
USSF Division 2 Professional League players
North American Soccer League players
Danish Superliga players
Danish 1st Division players
Major League Soccer players
USL Championship players
American expatriate soccer players
Expatriate men's footballers in Denmark
American expatriate sportspeople in Denmark
Expatriate soccer players in Canada
American expatriate sportspeople in Canada